Duncan Dunbar (1764 – 1825) was a Scottish brewer and wine merchant.

Dunbar was born in Balnageith near Forres, in what was then Elginshire. He settled in Limehouse, London in the 1790s, establishing his alcohol business at Dunbar wharf.

On the death of their father, Duncan and his brother John took on the running of the business. Duncan junior bought out his brother John. Then he expanded the business into shipping. He was extremely successful and when he died on 6 March 1862 at his home at Porchester Terrace, Paddington his fortune amounted to £1.5 million.

External links
 Duncan Dunbar and his Ships

References

1825 deaths
18th-century Scottish businesspeople
Year of birth unknown
Wine merchants
Year of birth uncertain
19th-century Scottish businesspeople
1764 births